Dick's Picks Volume 18 is a three-CD live album by the rock band the Grateful Dead. It was recorded on February 3, 1978, at the Dane County Coliseum in Madison, Wisconsin and on February 5, 1978, at the UNI-Dome in Cedar Falls, Iowa. There are also two songs from the February 4, 1978 show at the Milwaukee Auditorium in Milwaukee, Wisconsin.  The album was released in June 2000.

Disc 1 combines songs from the February 3, 4, and 5 concerts in an order designed to simulate a first set of a Dead concert from that era.  Disc 2 contains most of the second set plus the encore from the February 3 show.  Disc 3 includes all of the second set from February 5.

This release is known to have a patched cut in the original soundboard tapes. If certain soundboards are missing parts of a song those creating the release will attempt to patch the cut if possible. Sometimes this is from an audience source or from an entirely different show. However, there is no database for these fixed soundboards and hence it is up to the listeners to stumble upon such a discovery. Track 4 on Disc 3, Truckin', contains a patch from the Truckin' recorded on 1978-01-31. The patch from 1978-01-31 starts at ~2:00 and ends at ~3:40 on the official release.

Enclosure, article, and fan letter

Included in this release is a single-sheet of paper folded into fourths accordion-style, yielding an eight-page enclosure.  The front matches the front cover of the CD, and the two pages immediately inside list the credits for the release underneath a wide black-and-white photograph of the entire band on stage.  The next two pages list the contents of the release interspersed with smaller black-and-white photographs focusing more on each of the band's members.

The enclosure also features two pages containing a collage consisting of a newspaper clipping and a letter to guitarist Jerry Garcia from a fan, with the fan letter partially covered up by a black-and-white photo of the band on stage.

Article

The article is entitled "There's nothing like a Grateful Dead show" and was written by Michael St. John.  The CD's credits include a "Special Thanks to J. Corkey Custer/Emerald City Chronicle," which implies it is from the Emerald City Chronicle.

St. John focuses on the February 3rd show at Madison, and in the first paragraph the author mentions that "Phil Lesh said that they would have to play in Madison more often."  He writes that the two drummers, Mickey Hart and Bill Kreutzmann, "play together, and off one another, as if they were one."  The author goes on to state that "This reciprocal action and reaction is characteristic of how the Dead play in general", and that when they played newer songs off their recent studio release, Terrapin Station, they substituted "intricate improvization" for "the orchestration" on the release.

Michael ends his article by stating "Madison hopes that you remember us on your next tour, Phil."

Fan letter

The fan letter is hand-written, dated February 4, 1978, and signed by Paul, a 20-year-old guitarist who is "primarily a jazz fan of the Miles Davis school."

Paul writes of how he was impressed by both Jerry's "long improvisations" and his "shorter breaks in the first set", and claims that "you are one of the great stylists of guitar."  The letter-writer goes on to state that "What really impressed [me] last night was seeing an established player like yourself who is still practicing and growing - it's really an inspiration to me as [a] guitarist to keep me progressing."

After mentioning how he enjoyed seeing Django Reinhardt's "influence in your playing", Jerry's fan closes by writing "Someday, if I get the opportunity, I'd like to meet you as you've been so important to me for so long from afar."

Critical reception

On AllMusic, William Ruhlmann said, "The jury-rigged first set is an interesting combination of old and recent material, but the meat of the album comes on the second and third discs, which feature long medleys full of exploratory instrumental passages.... And the performances are typical, with first-set songs like "Passenger" and "The Music Never Stopped" getting feisty treatment, while the second sets run on and on with the kind of unhurried improvising that delights Deadheads and bores people not attuned to the band's tendencies."

In The Music Box, John Metzger wrote, "Each of the songs that appear on Dick's Picks 18 is exquisitely performed. Consequently, this is not just a collection for those most rabid of Grateful Dead fans with countless hours of bootleg tapes lying around their abode. Anyone who has wondered just what the big deal was with this band, just might find the answer lurking among the three hours and fifty minutes of music contained in this collection."

Track listing

Personnel 
Grateful Dead:
Jerry Garcia – guitar, vocals
Donna Jean Godchaux – vocals
Keith Godchaux – keyboards
Mickey Hart – drums
Bill Kreutzmann – drums
Phil Lesh – bass, vocals
Bob Weir – guitar, vocals
Production:
Recording: Betty Cantor-Jackson
Tape archivists: Dick Latvala, David Lemieux
Mastering: Jeffrey Norman
Photography: Bruce Polonsky, Keith Wessel

Notes

18
2000 live albums